Peter Gabriel Carvalho Caraballo (born 25 September 1992) is a Portuguese footballer who plays for Amora FC as a forward. He also holds Uruguayan citizenship.

Football career
On 2 August 2015, Caraballo made his professional debut with Oriental in a 2015–16 Taça da Liga match against Freamunde.

References

External links

1992 births
Sportspeople from Lausanne
Living people
Portuguese footballers
Association football forwards
Associação Naval 1º de Maio players
Clube Oriental de Lisboa players
Liga Portugal 2 players